Bangladesh Judicial Service Commission is a government commission that is responsible for the recruitment and examination of judges in Bangladesh and is located in Dhaka, Bangladesh. Justice Hasan Foez Siddique is the present chairman of the commission. The commission is mostly known for maintaining fair recruitment -through it the most talented students are getting recruited in the Bangladesh judiciary. The judges recruited under it are playing a cutting-edge role in the justice delivery system of Bangladesh 

The raison d'être of the BJSC may be characterized as identifying individuals for judicial service based on their intellectual abilities, analytical skills and general proficiency in the laws.

History
The commission was established in 2007.  A judge of the Appellate Division is selected to the chairman of the commission. It is managed by a chairman and 10-member governing body.

References

Organisations based in Dhaka
2007 establishments in Bangladesh
Legal organisations based in Bangladesh